Misikella is an extinct genus of conodonts. 

Two species were named as type species for the genus in separate publications by the same authors in the same year (1974). The first paper named Misikella longidentata, while the second named Misikella posthernsteini. Most species assigned to Misikella have a Norian-Rhaetian distribution and a bimembrate conodont apparatus, including M. posthernsteini. On the other hand, M. longidentata has a Carnian-Norian distribution and a tetramembrate apparatus. Fåhræus & Ryley (1989) retained the name Misikella for only M. longidentata, placing the rest of the species into the new genus Axiothea. However, other conodont specialists utilize the name Misikella primarily in the context of M. posthernsteini and other bimembrate species, rather than M. longidentata.

Use in stratigraphy 
The top of the Norian (the base of the Rhaetian, stages of the Upper Triassic) is close to the first appearance of several species of Misikella, as well as Epigondolella mosheri. In 2010, the Norian-Rhaetian boundary was defined by the first appearance of Misikella posthernsteini.

The most often-discussed Rhaetian GSSP Candidate sections are in Steinbergkogel in Austria, or Pignola-Abriola in Italy.

References 

 Conodonts of the genus Misikella Kozur and Mock, 1974 from the Rhaetian of the Tatra Mts (West Carpathians). A Gazdzicki, Acta Palaeontologica Polonica, 1978

External links 
 
 

Conodont genera
Triassic conodonts
Norian first appearances
Rhaetian extinctions